Ivan Václavík (born 2 November 1971) is a retired Slovak football midfielder.

References

1971 births
Living people
Slovak footballers
SFC Opava players
MŠK Rimavská Sobota players
FK Baník Most players
ŠK Blava Jaslovské Bohunice players
ŠK LR Crystal Lednické Rovne players
FK Slavoj Trebišov players
Association football midfielders
Czech First League players
Slovak expatriate footballers
Expatriate footballers in the Czech Republic
Slovak expatriate sportspeople in the Czech Republic